The Kampuchean People's Representative Assembly was the official name of the unicameral legislature of Cambodia during the Democratic Kampuchea period. It was established as the official legislature of Kampuchea on January 5, 1976, consisting of 250 members.

Of the seats, 150 were, due to the constitution, to be reserved for representatives of the peasants, 50 for the "laborers and other working people" and 50 for the Kampuchean Revolutionary Army. All representatives were to be elected simultaneously by secret ballot for five year terms, with the first and only elections taking place on March 20, 1976.

The assembly held its first and only plenary session on April 11 to 13, appointing the State Presidium, consisting of a president, a first vice president, and a second vice president, as well elected the "administration", the official government of Democratic Kampuchea, and the Standing Committee, due to represent the assembly when not gathered. The members of the KPRA were never elected; the Central Committee of the Communist Party of Kampuchea (CPK) appointed the chairman and other high officials both to it and to the State Praesidium. Plans for elections of members were discussed, but the 250 members of the KPRA were in fact appointed by the upper echelon of the CPK.

The assembly was effectively abolished when the Vietnamese captured Phnom Penh on January 7, 1979, establishing the People's Republic of Kampuchea.

Results

|-
!style="background-color:#E9E9E9" align=left valign=top width=450|List
!style="background-color:#E9E9E9" align=right|Seats
|-
|align=left|Groups represented in the Assembly''
Kampuchean Revolutionary Army 
Labourers and "other working people"
Peasants 
|valign="top"|5050150
|-
|style="background-color:#E9E9E9" align=left|Total
|width="30" align="right" style="background-color:#E9E9E9"|250
|-
|colspan=2|Source: 
|}

Presidents of the Standing Committee of the Kampuchean People's Representative Assembly:
 Nuon Chea, April 13, 1976 – January 7, 1979

References

Government of Cambodia
Democratic Kampuchea
Parliament of Cambodia
Defunct national legislatures